Berni Huber (born 11 July 1967 in Obermaiselstein) is a retired German alpine skier who competed in the 1992 Winter Olympics.

External links
 sports-reference.com
 

1967 births
Living people
German male alpine skiers
Olympic alpine skiers of Germany
Alpine skiers at the 1992 Winter Olympics
People from Oberallgäu
Sportspeople from Swabia (Bavaria)
20th-century German people